TeleSAT may refer to:

 Telecommunications satellite
 Telesat, a Canadian telecom satellite operator
 TéléSAT, a Belgian satellite television company

See also
 Satellite television
 Satellite telephone
 Tele (disambiguation)
 SAT (disambiguation)